Occupational hazards of fire debris cleanup are the hazards to health and safety of the personnel tasked with clearing the area of debris and combustion products after a conflagration. Once extinguished, fire debris cleanup poses several safety and health risks for workers.  Employers responsible for fire debris cleanup and other work in areas damaged or destroyed by fire are generally obliged by occupational safety and health legislation of the relevant national or regional authority to identify and evaluate hazards, correct any unsafe or unhealthy conditions and provide any necessary training and instruction and personal protective equipment to employees to enable them to carry out the task without undue exposure to hazards. Many of the approaches to control risk in occupational settings can be applied to preventing injuries and disease. This type of work can be completed by general construction firms who may not be fully trained specifically for fire safety and on fire hazards.  

Asbestos, which has well known health risks, is still quite commonly found in older buildings, and there are also risks from degraded roofing tiles, melted metals and electronics, unstable structures, and the sooty residues from burnt materials. Silica, one of the most common compounds on earth, can cause adverse health consequences if inhaled as fine particulates. Many combustion products are carcinogenic, particularly when inhaled as dusts.

Hazards

Safety 
Safety hazards of fire cleanup include the risk of re-ignition of smoldering debris, electrocution from downed or exposed electrical lines or in instances where water has come into contact with electrical equipment. Structures that have been burned may be unstable and at risk of sudden collapse. Other safety hazards may include flammable gases (i.e., propane) and gas storage tanks, tree work, confined spaces, sharp or flying objects, and heat related illnesses.

Hazardous substances
Burned residential areas may contain silica dust, asbestos, metals, or polyaromatic hydrocarbons. Additional health hazards of fire debris cleanup work may include carbon monoxide and hazardous liquids

Silica, or silicon dioxide, can occur in a crystalline or noncrystalline (amorphous) form. In fire debris, silica can be found in concrete, roofing tiles, or it may be a naturally occurring element in the rocks and soil of the burnt out areas. Occupational exposures to silica dust can cause silicosis, lung cancer, pulmonary tuberculosis, airway diseases, and some additional non-respiratory diseases. The Occupational Safety and Health Administration (OSHA) Permissible Exposure Limit (PEL)and National Institute for Occupational Safety and Health (NIOSH) Recommended Exposure Limit (REL) for silica is 50 micrograms per cubic meter (μg/m3) as an 8-hour Time Weighted Average (TWA). These limits are intended to reduce the risk of developing adverse health effects.

Asbestos was frequently used in building material in the past. It is a name given to a group of six different fibrous minerals (amosite, chrysotile, crocidolite, and the fibrous varieties of tremolite, actinolite, and anthophyllite). Inhalation of asbestos can result in various diseases including asbestosis, lung cancer, and mesothelioma. The OSHA PEL for airborne asbestos is determined by Phase Contrast Microscopy and is set at 0.1 fiber per cubic centimeter (f/cc) for fibers greater than 5 μm in length and an aspect ratio (length to width) greater than or equal to 3:1.

In fire debris clean up, sources of metals exposure include burnt or melted electronics, cars, refrigerators, stoves, etc. These metals can melt and be found in residential fire debris. Fire debris cleanup workers may be exposed to these metals or their combustion products in the air or on their skin. These metals may include beryllium, cadmium, chromium, cobalt, lead, manganese, nickel, and many more.

Polyaromatic hydrocarbons (PAHs), some of which are carcinogenic, come from the incomplete combustion of organic materials and are often found as a result of structural and wildland fires.

Hazard controls 
Standard personal protective equipment for fire cleanup include hard hats, goggles or safety glasses, heavy work gloves, earplugs or other hearing protection, steel-toe boots, and fall protection devices.

Hazard controls for electrical injury include assuming all power lines are energized until the power provider confirms they are de-energized, and grounding power lines on both the load- and supply-sides of the work area to guard against electrical feedback if a portable generator is turned on elsewhere in the power grid.  Appropriate personal protective equipment includes rubber gloves, dielectric overshoes, and insulated sticks and cable cutters.

Proper respiratory protection can protect against hazardous substances.  Proper ventilation of an area is an engineering control that can be used to avoid or minimize exposure to hazardous substances.  When ventilation is insufficient or dust cannot be avoided, personal protective equipment such as N95 respirators can be used.

Risk assessment 
Before authorising cleanup work by employees, the employer may be legally obliged to assess the risks to health and safety of the intended work, and provide appropriate instructions, training and personal protective equipment to the employees. Adequate risk assessment involves consideration of all known, reasonably predictable, and suspected hazards, including full disclosure of known hazards by the client in cases where a contractor is taken on to do the work. Details of this obligation will depend on the national or state legislation relevant to the locality.

See also

References

External links
"Evaluation of Dermal Exposure to Polycyclic Aromatic Hydrocarbons in Fire Fighters": a report by the National Institute for Occupational Safety and Health

Firefighting
Occupational hazards